Kaupichthys japonicus is an eel in the family Chlopsidae. It was described by Kiyomatsu Matsubara and Hirotoshi Asano in 1960. It was originally a subspecies of Kaupichthys diodontus (the common false moray). It is a tropical, marine eel which is known from Japan (from which its specific epithet is derived) and the South China Sea, in the western Pacific Ocean. K. japonicus spawns in the summer.

References

Chlopsidae
Fish described in 1960
Taxa named by Kiyomatsu Matsubara
Taxa named by Hirotoshi Asano